Singleton House may refer to:

in the United States
(by state)
Singleton House (Eatonton, Georgia), listed on the National Register of Historic Places (NRHP) in Georgia
Singleton-Lathem-Large House, Chesterfield, New Jersey, listed on the NRHP in New Jersey
Heidt Tavern-Singleton House, Wartrace, Tennessee, listed on the NRHP in Tennessee
Capt. William E. Singleton House, Jefferson, Texas, listed on the NRHP in Texas
Samuel Singleton House, Ferron, Utah, listed on the NRHP in Utah